Les Orres is a commune in the Hautes-Alpes department in southeastern France.

It is chiefly known for its ski resort: 38 alpine skiing runs,  of runs.

Geography

Climate
Les Orres has a humid continental climate (Köppen climate classification Dfb).

Population

See also
Communes of the Hautes-Alpes department

References

Communes of Hautes-Alpes
Ski areas and resorts in France
Caturiges